Canada Life Centre (formerly MTS Centre and Bell MTS Place) is an indoor arena in downtown Winnipeg, Manitoba. The arena is the home of the National Hockey League's Winnipeg Jets and their American Hockey League affiliate, the Manitoba Moose.

The arena stands on the former Eaton's site and is owned and operated by True North Sports & Entertainment. The 440,000 square feet (41,000 m2) building was constructed at a cost of $133.5 million CAD. It opened on November 16, 2004, replacing the since-demolished Winnipeg Arena. It has a capacity of 15,321 for hockey and 16,345 for concerts.

History
With the bankruptcy of the iconic Eaton's retailer, the famed store that was originally constructed in Winnipeg was emptied in late 2001. Various alternative uses for the building (including residential condominiums) were suggested, but ultimately the arena was deemed to be the most viable and beneficial to the city's struggling downtown by Winnipeg Mayor Glen Murray and True North. After a small, but emotional resistance to losing the Western Canadian landmark Eaton's building by some locals and the Save the Eaton's Coalition, which inspired a "group hug" of the "Big Store" by a reported 180 people in 2001, the store was demolished in 2002 to make way for the new entertainment complex.

The arena officially opened on November 16, 2004, replacing the aging Winnipeg Arena, which had been in operation since 1955. In recognizing Eaton's history, red bricks were incorporated into the design of the arena façade, evoking the memory of their store that had once graced Portage Avenue. An original store window and Tyndall stone surround is mounted in the arena concourse to house a collection of Eaton's memorabilia. In addition, two war memorials were incorporated into the building. The Timothy Eaton statue that was once a main feature of the store is also housed on the concourse of the arena, one floor directly above where it stood on the ground floor of the original Eaton's building.

Originally known as the "True North Centre" during its planning and construction stages, it was named MTS Centre as part of a naming rights agreement with Manitoba Telecom Services (MTS). It was renamed Bell MTS Place on May 30, 2017 following Bell Canada's acquisition of MTS. On June 15, 2021, True North announced that the naming rights had been sold to Canada Life under a 10-year agreement.

Events

Ice hockey

American Hockey League
 The AHL's Manitoba Moose were the arena's first tenant, from its opening in 2004 to 2011. The team relocated to St. John's prior to the 2011–12 AHL season to make way for the arrival of the Winnipeg Jets. The Moose returned to the MTS Centre for the 2015–16 season, making the arena the first (together with the SAP Center at San Jose) to be home to both an NHL team and its AHL affiliate. Only the lower bowl, which has a capacity of 8,812, is used for the majority of Moose home games.

The arena hosted the AHL All-Star Classic on February 1, 2006, in which Team Canada defeated Team PlanetUSA, 9-4.

National Hockey League
From 1972 to 1996, the original Winnipeg Jets played home games out of the now-demolished Winnipeg Arena. Facing mounting financial troubles, the franchise relocated to Arizona after the 1995–96 NHL season and became the Phoenix Coyotes (now Arizona Coyotes).

The idea of Winnipeg one day returning to the NHL gained momentum after the MTS Centre opened. David Thomson and Mark Chipman were floated as potential owners of an NHL team, although many questions were raised about the MTS Centre's potential suitability as an NHL venue. The arena's capacity was well below that of the next-smallest NHL arena at that time, the Nassau Veterans Memorial Coliseum, which sat 16,170 but lacked modern design elements. Chipman stated that the arena's current size was sufficient for an NHL team due to the unique economics of the local market.

Prior to receiving an NHL team, the MTS Centre hosted several NHL preseason games. The first was held on September 17, 2006 between the Edmonton Oilers and the Phoenix Coyotes (the former Winnipeg Jets) in front of a sold-out crowd, which the Oilers won 5–0. The NHL exhibition game became an annual event for the MTS Centre, concluding in September 2010 when the defending Stanley Cup champions, the Chicago Blackhawks, led by captain and Winnipeg-born Jonathan Toews, played the Tampa Bay Lightning in front of a crowd of 14,092.'

On May 19, 2011, The Globe and Mail reported that Mark Chipman and True North were finalizing the purchase of the Atlanta Thrashers, with the intent of moving the team to Winnipeg. Chipman and True North had also floated a proposal to return the Coyotes to Winnipeg though this was declined in favor to keeping it in Phoenix. Twelve days later, True North chairman Mark Chipman, NHL Commissioner Gary Bettman, and Premier of Manitoba Greg Selinger held a press conference at the MTS Centre to announce the deal, which was formally approved by the NHL Board of Governors three weeks later. As part of the transition to the NHL, the arena went through some minor renovations to bring it in line with the league's standards, including construction of additional press boxes, shuttered lighting, flexible rink glass, and an upgraded ice refrigeration system. Further improvements were made over the next few years, including concourse improvements, installation of a new HD scoreboard, and the replacement of metal rails with plexiglass to eliminate obstructed views around the arena. A total of 278 premium seats were added to the upper level in 2015, slightly increasing the arena's capacity.

With a capacity of just over 15,300 for NHL games, Canada Life Centre is the second smallest arena in the NHL, holding over 10,000 more fans than the Arizona Coyotes Mullett Arena.

International
Canada Life Centre co-hosted the 2007 IIHF Women's World Championship with Selkirk, which was won by Canada. Other international matches hosted at the arena included 2005 World Junior Championship pretournament games, the fifth game of the 2007 Super Series between Canada and Russia, and the medal round of the 2011 World U-17 Hockey Challenge.

Curling
Canada Life Centre hosted the 2008 Tim Hortons Brier. From 2005 through 2010 (barring the 2007–08 edition that was held in Quebec City), the arena hosted the Grand Slam of Curling's Canadian Open.

Combat sports
On June 15, 2013, the arena hosted UFC 161.

In professional wrestling, it hosted a broadcast of WWE Raw on February 24, 2020, which was ultimately the final non-hockey event to be held at the arena before the implementation of COVID-19 pandemic restrictions. WWE SmackDown was broadcast from Canada Life Centre on September 30, 2022, which was part of WWE's first shows in Canada since the beginning of the pandemic.

Entertainment

Manitoba Hockey Hall of Fame and Museum

See also
List of indoor arenas in Canada

References

External links

Basketball venues in Canada
Curling venues in Canada
Indoor arenas in Manitoba
Indoor ice hockey venues in Canada
Manitoba Moose
National Hockey League venues
Music venues completed in 2004
Music venues in Winnipeg
Sports venues completed in 2004
Sports venues in Winnipeg
True North Sports & Entertainment
Volleyball venues in Canada
Winnipeg Jets
American Hockey League venues